Betaguttavirus is a genus of viruses, in the family Guttaviridae. Aeropyrum pernix archaea serve as natural hosts. There is only one species in this genus: Aeropyrum pernix ovoid virus 1.

Structure
Viruses in the genus Betaguttavirus are enveloped. The diameter is around 70-55 nm. Genomes are circular.

Life cycle
DNA-templated transcription is the method of transcription. Aeropyrum pernix archaea serve as the natural host. Transmission routes are passive diffusion.

References

External links
 ICTV Online Report Guttaviridae
 Viralzone: Betaguttavirus

Guttaviridae
Virus genera